The International Bureau of Weights and Measures (BIPM) is an intergovernmental organisation, through which its 59 member-states act together on measurement standards in four areas: chemistry, ionising radiation, physical metrology, and coordinated universal time. It is based in Saint-Cloud, Paris, France. The organisation has been referred to as IBWM (from its name in English) in older literature.

Structure
The BIPM is supervised by the International Committee for Weights and Measures, a committee of eighteen members that meet normally in two sessions per year, which is in turn overseen by the General Conference on Weights and Measures that meets in Paris usually once every four years, consisting of delegates of the governments of the Member States and observers from the Associates of the CGPM. These organs are also commonly referred to by their French initialisms.

History
The BIPM was created on 20 May 1875, following the signing of the Metre Convention, a treaty among 17 Member States ( there are now 59 members). 

It is based at the Pavillon de Breteuil in Saint-Cloud, France, a  site (originally ) granted to the Bureau by the French Government in 1876. Since 1969 the site has been considered international territory, and the BIPM has all the rights and privileges accorded an intergovernmental organisation. This status was further clarified by the French decree No 70-820 of 9 September 1970.

Function
The BIPM has the mandate to provide the basis for a single, coherent system of measurements throughout the world, traceable to the International System of Units (SI). This task takes many forms, from direct dissemination of units to coordination through international comparisons of national measurement standards (as in electricity and ionising radiation).

Following consultation, a draft version of the BIPM Work Programme is presented at each meeting of the General Conference for consideration with the BIPM budget. The final programme of work is determined by the CIPM in accordance with the budget agreed to by the CGPM.

Currently, the BIPM's main work includes:

 Scientific and technical activities carried out in its four departments: chemistry, ionising radiation, physical metrology, and time
 Liaison and coordination work, including providing the secretariat for the CIPM Consultative Committees and some of their Working Groups and for the CIPM MRA, and providing institutional liaison with the other bodies supporting the international quality infrastructure and other international bodies
 Capacity building and knowledge transfer programs to increase the effectiveness within the worldwide metrology community of those Member State and Associates with emerging metrology systems
 A resource centre providing a database and publications for international metrology

The BIPM is one of the twelve member organisations of the International Network on Quality Infrastructure (INetQI), which promotes and implements QI activities in metrology, accreditation, standardisation and conformity assessment.

The BIPM has an important role in maintaining accurate worldwide time of day. It combines, analyses, and averages the official atomic time standards of member nations around the world to create a single, official Coordinated Universal Time (UTC).

Directors 

Since its establishment, the directors of the BIPM have been:

See also
 History of the metre
 Institute for Reference Materials and Measurements
 International Organization for Standardization
 Metrologia
 National Institute of Standards and Technology
 Seconds pendulum
 World Metrology Day
 Versailles project on advanced materials and standards

References

External links

 

Intergovernmental organizations established by treaty
Metric system
Metrology organizations
Organizations based in Paris
Organizations established in 1875
Standards organizations in France